Events from the year 1953 in Romania. The year saw the death of Carol II.

Incumbents 
President of the Provisional Presidium of the Republic: Petru Groza .
Prime Minister and General Secretary of the Romanian Communist Party: Gheorghe Gheorghiu-Dej.

Events 
 9 March – The Patriarch of All Romania, Justinian, lays flowers on Joseph Stalin's tomb during the funeral of the Soviet leader.
 17 July – Construction of the Danube–Black Sea Canal is halted. The canal had been the site of multiple executions.
 2 August – The 4th World Festival of Youth and Students opens at the Stadionul August 23 and runs until 14 August. The event includes athletics and dance performances.
 23 October – Romania provides $7.2 million in aid to North Korea to support reconstruction after the Korean War.

Births 
 14 February – Ioan Dzițac, mathematician (died 2021).
 5 March – Radu Berceanu, engineer and politician.
 24 March – Sorin Popa, mathematician.
 31 March – Maria Micșa, medal winner at the 1976 Summer Olympics in quadruple skulls.
 12 April — Andrei Broder, computer scientist and engineer.
 30 June — Adriana Hölszky, composer and pianist.
 13 July – Violeta Dinescu, composer of choral music.
 19 July – Daniela Buruiană, politician and Member of the European Parliament.

Deaths 

 5 February – Iuliu Maniu, Romanian lawyer and politician, Prime Minister of Romania in 1928–1930 and 1932–1933, died in Sighet Prison (born 1873).
 25 March – Ion Cămărășescu, politician, died in Sighet Prison (born 1882).
 4 April – Carol II, King from 8 June 1930 to 6 September 1940 (born 1893).
 23–27 April – Gheorghe I. Brătianu, politician and historian, titular member of the Romanian Academy, died in Sighet Prison (born 1898).
 13 May – Nicolae Tătăranu, major general in World War II (born 1890).
 16 May – Nicolae Rădescu, Prime Minister between 7 December 1944 and 1 March 1945 (born 1874).
 7 June – Ioan Flueraș, social democratic politician, murdered at Gherla Prison (born 1882).
 27 June – Ioan Suciu, bishop of the Greek-Catholic Church, died at Sighet Prison (born 1907).
 5 September – Constantin Levaditi, physician and microbiologist (born 1874).
 3 October – Szilárd Bogdánffy, auxiliary bishop of the Catholic Church, died at Aiud Prison (born 1911).
 2 December – Radu Băldescu, major general during World War II, died at Jilava Prison (born 1888).

References 

Years of the 20th century in Romania
1950s in Romania
1953 in Romania
Romania
Romania